Heredotia may refer to:
Herodotia (wasp) – Herodotia Girault, 1931 – a genus of fig wasps
Herodotia (plant) – Herodotia Urb. & Ekman [1826] – a genus of plants in the family Asteraceae